Marz, plural marzer, is the name for a first-level administrative entity in Armenia. In English it is usually translated as province or region.

The divisions in the Republic of Artsakh are not called marz. Instead, they are known as shrjan.

Etymology
This Armenian word is derived from the Persian word marz (مرز), meaning "border," cognate with English march.

See also
 Administrative divisions of Armenia
 Administrative divisions of the Republic of Artsakh
 March (territory)

Types of administrative division
Persian words and phrases